Benjamin James Gibbon (born 9 June 2000) is an English cricketer who plays for Worcestershire. Before signing his contract with Worcestershire, Gibbon had played for Cheshire in the National Counties Cricket Championship, where he was named their Bowler of the Year.

Gibbon was born in Chester, and worked on construction sites as a builder. He began to play cricket in 2018. In September 2021, Gibbon signed his first professional contract, with a two-year deal with Worcestershire. Prior to signing his contract, he had already played for Worcestershire in the Second XI Championship. A month before signing his contract, he took a five-wicket haul for Cheshire against Wiltshire in the 2021 National Counties Championship at Moss Lane, Alderley Edge. Paul Pridgeon, Worcestershire's Steering Group Chairman said that Gibbon has "a lot of potential" and that he "brings something different to our group of bowlers".

Gibbon made his first-class debut on 5 May 2022, for Worcestershire against Durham in the 2022 County Championship. In the first innings of the match, he took two wickets, included that of Scott Borthwick, the captain of Durham. Two months before his debut, Gibbon said that he would "like to break into the first team" and that his "ambition is to be a professional".

References

External links
 

2000 births
Living people
English cricketers
Cheshire cricketers
Worcestershire cricketers
Sportspeople from Chester